Anders Olof Andersson also known as Olle Andersson (1932–2017) was an international speedway rider from Sweden.

Speedway career 
Andersson reached the final of the Speedway World Championship in the 1956 Individual Speedway World Championship.

After visiting the United States in 1957 he emigrated to the United States the following year.

World Final Appearances

Individual World Championship
 1956 -  London, Wembley Stadium - 14th - 2pts

References 

1932 births
2017 deaths
Swedish speedway riders